Magic Box is the fourth studio album by Norwegian band Bel Canto, released on 27 February 1996 by Lava Records and Atlantic Records.

Reception

AllMusic awarded the album 4 stars, and the Dagbladet reviewer Øyvind Rønning awarded the album dice 5.

Track listing

Personnel

Musicians
 Anneli Marian Drecker – vocals, keyboards
 Nils Johansen – guitar, mandolin, violin, programming
 Eivind Aarset – guitar
 Nils Petter Molvær – trumpet
 B.J. Cole – steel guitar
 Jah Wobble – bass, breathing
 Dinesh – tablas
 Fazal Qureshi – ablas
 Andreas Eriksen – percussion
 Jaki Liebezeit – drums
 Chuck Frazier – background vocals

Technical
 Hans Grottheim – engineering
 Per Martinsen – engineering assistance
 Ken Theodorsen – engineering assistance
 Mark Ferda – engineering, mixing, production
 Ulf Holand – engineering, mixing, production
 Jah Wobble – production
 Bel Canto – production
 Brenda Rotheiser – art direction, design

Charts

Certifications

References

1996 albums
Bel Canto (band) albums